D60 or D 60 may refer to:

Cameras
 Canon EOS D60, a discontinued 6.3 megapixel digital single lens reflex camera
 Nikon D60, a 10.2-megapixel F-mount digital single-lens reflex camera

Roads
 D60 road (Croatia), a state road
 D 60, Al Rashidiya Road, a road connecting Muhaisnah in Dubai Emirate, United Arab Emirates

Vehicles
 D60 steam locomotive, a 1951 Japanese 2-8-4 Berkshire wheel arrangement steam locomotives model
 HMS Caradoc (D60), a C-class light cruiser built for the Royal Navy during World War I
 Junpai D60, a 2014–present Chinese subcompact crossover
 Maxus D60, a 2019–present Chinese mid-size SUV
 New Flyer D60, a 1987–2006 Canadian high-floor transit bus
 Senova D60, a 2014–2017 Chinese mid-size sedan
 Venucia D60, a 2017–present Chinese compact sedan

Other uses
 Queen's Gambit Declined (D60), an Encyclopedia of Chess Openings code
 Acquired pure red cell aplasia ICD-10 code
 Pueblo School District 60 in Pueblo, Colorado

See also
 60D (disambiguation)
 60 (disambiguation)